Adelaide Showground railway station is located on the Belair, Flinders and Seaford lines, and is located in the inner western Adelaide suburb of Keswick. It is four kilometres from Adelaide station, and replaced Keswick station and the temporary Showground Central station.

History 
The station opened on 17 February 2014. Unlike the former Showground Central station, which was only used during the Royal Adelaide Show, Adelaide Showground station is serviced every day as a regular part of the Belair, Flinders and Seaford lines. The interstate Adelaide Parklands Terminal is located nearby.

In late 2016, the station was ranked as the best station in the western suburbs based on five criteria. The reasons cited included: "Excellent condition in regard to all items, reflecting the recent construction and good upkeep since. No toilets. There are relatively few seats."

Services by platform

Bus transfers
The closest bus stops are Stop 1 on Anzac Highway, 1A on Richmond Road and 1B on Greenhill Road.

|}

|}

|}

References

External links
 Flickr gallery

Railway stations in Adelaide
Railway stations in Australia opened in 2014
Keswick, South Australia